Athrips nigristriata is a moth of the family Gelechiidae. It is found in China (Ningxia).

The wingspan is about 12 mm. The forewings are light grey, covered with black-tipped scales and with three black points at the base near the costal margin, in the middle and near the dorsal margin. There are also two small black spots in the middle and in the corner of the cell, one black point at the costal three-fifths and black points along the termen to the tornus, as well as a black streak from the middle under the costal margin to near the corner of the cell. The hindwings are light grey. Adults are on wing at the end of June.

Etymology
The species name refers to the wing pattern and is derived from the Latin prefix  (meaning black) and Latin  (meaning streak).

References

Moths described in 2009
Athrips
Moths of Asia